Shiba Prasad Chatterjee  (22 February 1903 – 27 February 1989) was a Professor of Geography at the University of Calcutta, India. He served as President of the International Geographical Union from 1964 until 1968, Chatterjee received a Murchison Award from the Royal Geographical Society in 1959, and a Padma Bhushan from the Government of India in 1985. He coined the name 'Meghalaya' for one of India's states.

Bibliography

References

Sources
 Mookerjee, S. (1998): Shiba P. Chatterjee, 1903–1989. Geographers: biobibliographical studies 18.
 

1903 births
1989 deaths
Indian geographers
Recipients of the Padma Bhushan in literature & education
Bangabasi College alumni
University of Calcutta alumni
Banaras Hindu University alumni
Academic staff of the University of Calcutta
Presidents of the International Geographical Union
20th-century Indian earth scientists
20th-century geographers